Hrebinky is an urban-type settlement in Bila Tserkva Raion (district) of Kyiv Oblast (region) in northern Ukraine. It hosts the administration of Hrebinky settlement hromada, one of the hromadas of Ukraine. Its population is 6,993 as of the 2001 Ukrainian Census. Current population: .

Hrebinky was founded in 1612 as a village, and it retained its village status until it was upgraded to that of an urban-type settlement in 1958.

Until 18 July 2020, Hrebinky belonged to Vasylkiv Raion. The raion was abolished that day as part of the administrative reform of Ukraine, which reduced the number of raions of Kyiv Oblast to seven. The area of Vasylkiv Raion was split between Bila Tserkva, Fastiv, and Obukhiv Raions, with Hrebinky being transferred to Bila Tserkva Raion.

The M05 highway, connecting the nation's capital Kyiv and the southern city of Odesa, passes through the town.

References

External links
 

Urban-type settlements in Bila Tserkva Raion
Populated places established in 1612
1612 establishments in the Polish–Lithuanian Commonwealth
1612 establishments in Ukraine